Otto Stenroth (13 May 1861 in Saarijärvi – 16 December 1939 in Helsinki) was a Finnish lawyer, politician and banker. 
  
He served as a member of Kansallis-Osake-Pankki bank executive board from 1889 to 1893, and deputy director general of Kansallis-Osake-Pankki bank executive board from 1893 to 1906. Thereafter, he served as the chairman of the board of Hypoteekkikassa from 1904 to 1908 and 1909 to 1916. Stenroth was the managing director of Finnish Real Estate Bank from 1907 to 1908 and 1909 to 1918.

Stenroth was a member of the Diet of Finland for the burghers 1891–1900. He was elected as a member of the parliament for the Young Finnish Party from the Eastern Province of Vaasa constituency 1908–1909. He was a member of the Helsinki City Council 1911-1918 and its vice chairman from 1915 to 1918.

Otto Stenroth was in the Senate of the Grand Duchy of Finland, head of the Senate Commerce and Industry Committee in the Hjelt cabinet 1908–1909. When Finland gained independence, Stenroth became the Head of the Foreign Affairs Board and a senator in the Paasikivi cabinet 27 May 1918 – 27 November 1918.

Stenroth was the Governor of Bank of Finland from 13 December 1918 to 20 January 1923.

References

1861 births
1939 deaths
People from Saarijärvi
People from Vaasa Province (Grand Duchy of Finland)
Young Finnish Party politicians
National Coalition Party politicians
Finnish senators
Ministers for Foreign Affairs of Finland
Members of the Diet of Finland
Members of the Parliament of Finland (1908–09)
Governors of the Bank of Finland
Finnish bankers